The Citroën Activa and Activa 2 were two concept cars produced by the French manufacturer Citroën as a means to test and to showcase features intended for future use in their production cars.  Both were unveiled at the Paris Motor Show in 1988 and 1990 respectively.  

The name Activa was later used to refer to the production Xantia fitted with Activa suspension.

Overview
Among the features seen on the Activa models was the electronically controlled hydropneumatic  suspension (known as the "Hydractive" system) combined with an active anti-roll bar.  This married Citroën's famous hydropneumatic suspension system to sophisticated electronics, enabling the handling of the car to automatically adapt to how it was being driven as well as virtually eliminating body roll (one of the main criticisms of Citroën's hydropneumatic system was the amount of body roll).  The Hydractive system was soon to become available to the public first in Citroën's XM model 1989, and Xantia model 1993. In 1995 Activa prototypes' active anti-roll-bar was introduced in the Xantia Activa, making it one of the few production cars to have active suspension.

Activa 1
The Activa 1 included full hydraulically connected, single wheel independent  four-wheel steering, anti-lock brakes and traction control, which were high-tech for the time, while the Activa 2 was more conventional, except the anti-roll-system and featured a center console keypad instead of a gear lever and a navigation system. In addition, the Activa 1 featured electronically operated doors which could all be opened at once using a remote control.

Activa 2

The Activa 2 was considered for production as a successor to the SM, but it was eventually decided that Citroën's image would make it too hard to compete with prestigious marques such as Mercedes-Benz and Porsche in the luxury 2-seat coupe market.

References

External links
 Forum Xantia Activa Club
 Xantia Activa Club de France 
 Citroën Activa 1 @ Citroënët
 Citroën Activa 2 @ Citroënët

Activa